Sivert Beck (18 November 1566 – 2 January 1623) was a Danish landholder and government official. He served as treasurer (rentemester) from 1596 until his death.

Early life and education 
Beck was born in the Bishop's House in Roskilde, the son of district judge Lauge Beck (c. 1530– 1607) and Agate Grubbe (1533–1623). He spent 1580–88 abroad, partly accompanied by his nephew, Sivert Grubbe. He studied at the universities in Wittenberg, Leipzig and Jena.

Career
In 1589 Beck began working at the Danish Chancellery. In 1590 he assumed the title of secretary. In this capacity, he was sent to Ribe to oversee that Anders Sørensen Vedel transferred his historical collections to Dr. Niels Krag (1595). On 16 November 1596, he was appointed treasurer (rentemester). He remained in the office until his death.

Beck was granted a prelate at Aarhus Cathedral in 1594 but in 1608 exchanged it for a canonry at Roskilde Cathedral. In both cases he was required to stay at the cathedral when no longer in royal service.

Late in life, he acted as guardian for Christian IV's illegitimate søn, Christian Ulrik Gyldenløve.

Property
Beck was a major landowner. He inherited Førslevgaard, Vibygård and Tågerød from his father in 1607. His wife brought Herlufstrup on Zealand and Vandås, Næsbyholm, Klabberup and Frenderup in Scania into the marriage.

In 1599–1623, he was lensmann of Giske in Norway.

Personal life
Beck married Lisbet Bille (14 April 1576 – 1656), a daughter of Steen Bille (1527–86) and Kirsten Lindenov (died 1612), on 5 September 1602. He was the father of Lauge Becj (1614–59) and Steen Beck.

References 

Danish civil servants
17th-century Danish landowners
People from Roskilde
1566 births
1623 deaths